Kupljenik is a village in the Municipality of Bled in the Upper Carniola region of Slovenia.

The village church is dedicated to Saint Stephen.

References

External links
Kupljenik at Geopedia

Populated places in the Municipality of Bled